The men's Greco-Roman 55 kilograms is a competition featured at the 2002 World Wrestling Championships, and was held at the Universal Sports Hall CSKA in Moscow, Russia from 20 to 21 September 2002.

Results
Legend
F — Won by fall

Preliminary round

Pool 1

Pool 2

Pool 3

Pool 4

Pool 5

Pool 6

Pool 7

Pool 8

Pool 9

Knockout round

References

Men's Greco-Roman 55 kg